This is a list of places on the Victorian Heritage Register in the Shire of Strathbogie in Victoria, Australia. The Victorian Heritage Register is maintained by the Heritage Council of Victoria.

The Victorian Heritage Register, as of 2021, lists the following fifteen state-registered places within the Shire of Strathbogie:

References 

Strathbogie
+
+